The Oath of Allegiance of Sweden (in Swedish called Tro- och huldhetsed which literally translates to Fidelity and Allegiance Oath) was an oath of allegiance to the King of Sweden that had to be taken by all senior public officeholders in Sweden before assuming office. It was abolished when the present-day Instrument of Government came into force on 1 January 1975.

The oath was as follows:

This in translation becomes;

See also
 King in Council (Sweden)

References

Sweden
Swedish monarchy
Legal history of Sweden
Government of Sweden